FTN (Flextech Television Network) was a television channel from Virgin Media Television (formerly known as Flextech) transmitting free-to-air on Freeview and Virgin Media, and as a subscription channel on Sky. The channel broadcast between 6pm and 6am daily. It launched at 6pm on 15 January 2003, the same day as its Freeview version, UK Bright Ideas, also partially owned by Virgin Media Television.

FTN's schedule featured entertainment and reality programming, and also programming from other Virgin Media Television cable channels, such as Living, Living2, Bravo, Bravo 2, Trouble TV, and Challenge TV. This provided a preview to Freeview viewers of what the Virgin Media channels offered, in a similar fashion to BSkyB's Sky Three, a channel which was also on Freeview.

FTN +1 launched on Sky and Virgin Media on 9 August, 2007. Despite being a one-hour timeshift, FTN +1 only broadcast from 7pm until 1am, as Live Roulette TV which broadcast on FTN from 12am till 3am, couldn't be rebroadcast one hour later, for legal reasons.

Final Programming

Participation TV
Previously The Great Big British Quiz broadcast nightly between the hours of 00:00 and 03:00am. (Big Game TV took this spot until April 2007) Between November 2005 and November 2006 Quiz Night Live broadcast from 22.00 - 01.00 daily only to be replaced by Ostrich Media's Quiz Call which ceased broadcasting on FTN on 1 January 2007.

In June 2007, Live Roulette TV began broadcasting on FTN between the hours of midnight and 03:00am.

Closure
It was announced in the summer of 2007 that Virgin Media Television was to launch a new channel, Virgin 1. The new channel launches on Monday 1 October, 2007. The channel was Virgin Media's attempt to rival Sky One.

As a result of this new channel, it was revealed the Ftn would close, leaving its EPG positions on Sky, Virgin Media and Freeview to Virgin 1.

Ftn closed at 6am on Monday 1 October, 2007, with Virgin 1 launching at 9pm on the same day.

References 	 

Defunct television channels in the United Kingdom
Living TV Group channels
Television channels and stations established in 2003
Television channels and stations disestablished in 2007
Television channels in the United Kingdom